Marcos Rafael Armas Ruiz (born August 5, 1969) is a Venezuelan former first baseman in Major League Baseball who played for the Oakland Athletics during the 1993 season. He was listed at 6' 5" (1.95 m) and 190 lb. (86 kg). He is the half-brother of former outfielder Tony Armas and uncle of pitcher Tony Armas Jr.

In one season with Oakland, Armas batted .194 (6-for-31), with one home run, two doubles, seven runs, and one RBI in 15 games.

See also
 List of players from Venezuela in Major League Baseball

External links

Pura Pelota – Venezuelan Professional Baseball League career

1969 births
Living people
Arizona League Athletics players
Cardenales de Lara players
Caribes de Oriente players
Huntsville Stars players
Madison Muskies players
Major League Baseball first basemen
Major League Baseball players from Venezuela
Modesto A's players
Oakland Athletics players
Olmecas de Tabasco players
People from Anzoátegui
Southern Oregon A's players
Tacoma Tigers players
Venezuelan expatriate baseball players in Mexico
Venezuelan expatriate baseball players in the United States